Erling Nielsen may refer to:

 Erling Nielsen (field hockey) (1922–1995), Danish Olympic hockey player
 Erling Nielsen (footballer) (1935–1996), Danish footballer
 Erling Nielsen (philologist) (1920–2000), Danish philologist